Stephen Kwadwo Osei-Nyame is a Ghanaian politician and member of the first parliament of the second republic of Ghana representing Akan constituency in the Volta Region of Ghana under the membership of the National Alliance Liberals (NAL)

Early life and education 
Osei-Nyame was born on 24 May 1937. He attended Achimota School and the University of Ghana where he obtained Bachelor of Arts and bachelor of laws degree.

Career and politics 
Osei-Nyame worked as a lawyer before going into Parliament. He began his political career in 1969 when he became the parliamentary candidate to represent Akan constituency  in the Volta Region of Ghana prior to the commencement of the 1969 Ghanaian parliamentary election.

He was sworn into the First Parliament of the Second Republic of Ghana on 1 October 1969, after being pronounced winner at the 1969 Ghanaian election held on 26 August 1969. and his tenure of office ended on 13 January 1972.

Personal life 
He is a  Christian.

References 

1937 births
Ghanaian MPs 1969–1972
People from Volta Region
University of Ghana alumni
Alumni of Achimota School
20th-century Ghanaian lawyers
Ghanaian Christians
National Alliance of Liberals politicians
Living people